The Bethel African Methodist Episcopal Church is a historic church at 895 Oak Street in Batesville, Arkansas.  It is a single-story sandstone structure, with a gable roof and a projecting square tower at the front.  The tower rises in stone to a hipped skirt, above which is a wood-frame belfry, which is topped by a shallow-pitch pyramidal roof.  The main entrance is set in the base of the tower, inside a round-arch opening.  Built in 1881, it is the oldest surviving church building in the city.

The church was listed on the National Register of Historic Places in 1986.

See also
National Register of Historic Places listings in Independence County, Arkansas

References

African Methodist Episcopal churches in Arkansas
Churches on the National Register of Historic Places in Arkansas
Churches completed in 1882
Churches in Independence County, Arkansas
National Register of Historic Places in Independence County, Arkansas
Buildings and structures in Batesville, Arkansas
1882 establishments in Arkansas
Sandstone churches in the United States